Vasily Andreevich Karatygin (–-) was a leading actor of Russian Romanticism.

Karatygin joined the Bolshoi Theatre in St Petersburg in 1820 and moved to the Alexandrine Theatre in 1832. He particularly excelled in the numerous productions of Shakespeare's and Schiller's plays, rivalling Moscow's Pavel Mochalov as the greatest Russian actor of his time. The two volumes of his Memoirs are invaluable.

Like other actors of his theatre, Karatygin was buried at the Smolensky Cemetery on Vasilievsky Island. His remains were later transferred to the national pantheon, the Alexander Nevsky Lavra. His wife Alexandra Kolosova was admired for her roles in Molière's comedies.

References

1802 births
1853 deaths
19th-century male actors from the Russian Empire
Russian male stage actors
Burials at Tikhvin Cemetery